Harri O'Connor (born 25 October 2000) is a Welsh rugby union player, currently playing for Pro14 and European Rugby Champions Cup side Scarlets. His preferred position is Tight head prop.

Professional career
A member of the Dorchester Rugby Football Club youth side, O'Connor was part of the Bath academy, before being spotted by the WRU Exiles program and moving to Wales.

O'Connor was named in the Scarlets academy for the 2020–21 season. In March 2021, he joined RFU Championship side  on loan. He made his debut on 7 March against , coming on as a replacement.

O'Connor made his  debut for the Scarlets on 16 October 2020 in a friendly against the Dragons. His professional debut came against the Ospreys on 1 January 2022.

He was called up for the Wales national rugby union team on their June 2022 to South Africa, as a backup for Tomas Francis. O'Connor was not named in any of the match day squads.

Personal life 
O'Connor was born in England, where his father was based for the British Army. His younger brother Sam is also a prop, and a member of the Scarlets academy.

References

External links
itsrugby.co.uk Profile

2000 births
Living people
Welsh rugby union players
Scarlets players
Rugby union props
Nottingham R.F.C. players